Eugene Moore (birthdate unknown) was a Negro leagues outfielder for several years before the founding of the first Negro National League, and in its first couple seasons.

References

External links
 and Baseball-Reference Black Baseball stats and Seamheads

Birmingham Giants players
Lincoln Giants players
St. Louis Giants players
Indianapolis ABCs players
Detroit Stars players
Louisville White Sox (1914-1915) players
St. Louis Stars (baseball) players
Year of birth missing
Year of death missing